Kuhsar Rural District may refer to:
 Kuhsar Rural District (Hashtrud County)
 Kuhsar Rural District (Isfahan Province)
 Kuhsar Rural District (Markazi Province)